Michal Vondrka (born May 17, 1982) is a Czech professional ice hockey forward who currently plays for Motor České Budějovice in the Czech Extraliga (ELH). He was selected by the Buffalo Sabres in the 5th round (155th overall) of the 2001 NHL Entry Draft.

Vondrka played previously for BK Mladá Boleslav, HC Slavia Praha, HC České Budějovice, IHC Písek, and HC Karlovy Vary.

Career statistics

Regular season and playoffs

International

References

External links

1982 births
Buffalo Sabres draft picks
Czech ice hockey right wingers
Motor České Budějovice players
HC Karlovy Vary players
HC Slavia Praha players
HC Slovan Bratislava players
Living people
Sportspeople from České Budějovice
Ice hockey players at the 2018 Winter Olympics
Olympic ice hockey players of the Czech Republic
Piráti Chomutov players
BK Mladá Boleslav players
HC Dynamo Pardubice players
IHC Písek players
Oulun Kärpät players
Czech expatriate ice hockey players in Slovakia
Czech expatriate ice hockey players in Finland